Martin Berger (born 10 December 1996) is a Finnish former ice hockey defenceman. He is known for his physical style of play.

Playing career
Berger made his Liiga debut playing with HC TPS during the 2014–15 Liiga season.

Due to heart complications, Berger retired at the age of 24.

Career statistics

Regular season and playoffs

References

External links

1996 births
Living people
Finnish ice hockey defencemen
HC TPS players
KooKoo players
Sportspeople from Turku
21st-century Finnish people